The Auerbacher Home, in Redlands, San Bernardino County, California, is a historic Modernist house commissioned by Frederick and Mary Jane Auerbacher. It was designed by architect Richard Neutra in 1951.

In 2011, when the house was nominated for listing on the National Register of Historic Places, the house was still furnished with living room chairs and a coffee table designed by Neutra, and Mary Jane Auerbacher still resided there.
It was listed on the National Register of Historic Places in 2012.

See also
 National Register of Historic Places listings in San Bernardino County, California

References 

Houses in San Bernardino County, California
Buildings and structures in Redlands, California
Houses completed in 1951
Houses on the National Register of Historic Places in California
National Register of Historic Places in San Bernardino County, California
Richard Neutra buildings
Modernist architecture in California
History of Redlands, California